Calendar Girl or Calendar Girls may refer to:

Music
 "Calendar Girl" (song), a 1961 song by Neil Sedaka
 "Calendar Girl", a song by Stars from Set Yourself on Fire
 Calendar Girl (Julie London album), by American singer Julie London
 Calendar Girl (soundtrack album), the soundtrack album of the 1993 film
 Calendar Girl (Sophie Monk album), by Australian singer Sophie Monk
 Calendar Girl, by British pop-rock band The Noise Next Door

Films
 The Calendar Girl, a 1917 American comedy drama film directed by Rollin S. Sturgeon
 Calendar Girl (1947 film), an American musical comedy film starring Kenny Baker and Irene Rich
 Calendar Girl (1993 film), an American comedy drama film starring Jason Priestley, Gabriel Olds, and Jerry O'Connell
 Calendar Girls, a 2003 British comedy film
  Calendar Girls (2015 film), an Indian Hindi-language drama film

Other
 Calendar Girls (play), a stage play based on the 2003 film of the same name
 Calendar Girls (musical), a musical based on the 2003 film of the same name
 Calendar Girl (DC Comics), a fictional character in The New Batman Adventures voiced by Sela Ward